The 2000 San Jose State Spartans football team represented San Jose State University in the 2000 NCAA Division I-A football season. The team played their home games at Spartan Stadium in San Jose, California. They participated as members of the Western Athletic Conference, and were coached by head coach Dave Baldwin.

Schedule

Schedule Source:

Game Summaries

at Nebraska

at Stanford

Southern Utah

at USC

Rice

at SMU

UTEP

at Nevada

at Hawaii

No. 9 TCU

at Tulsa

Fresno State

References

San Jose State
San Jose State Spartans football seasons
San Jose State Spartans football